Isleham railway station is a disused railway station on the Cambridge to Mildenhall railway in England.  The station was on the outskirts of the village of Isleham, Cambridgeshire and closed for passengers in 1962 and freight in 1964.

References

External links
 Isleham station on navigable 1946 O. S. map
 Photograph of station on www.eastanglianrailwayarchive.co.uk
 Photograph of station on www.isleham-village.co.uk
 Isleham at Disused Stations

Disused railway stations in Cambridgeshire
Former Great Eastern Railway stations
Railway stations in Great Britain opened in 1885
Railway stations in Great Britain closed in 1962
railway station